David Frank may refer to:

David Frank (media executive) (born 1958), CEO of Dial Square 86
David Frank (musician) (born 1952),  American music producer, composer and pianist
David Michael Frank (born 1948), American composer, music arranger, and conductor of film scores
David W. Frank (1949–2017), American teacher and writer

See also
David A. Frank-Kamenetskii (1910–1970), Soviet scientist

David Franks (disambiguation)